Keith Carroll (25 March 1930 – 23 September 2022) was an Australian rules footballer who played for Melbourne in the Victorian Football League (VFL) during the 1950s.

Debuting in 1952, Carroll was a half back flanker who never cemented his spot in the Melbourne side until the 1956 season. He played 20 games that year, including Melbourne's win over Collingwood in the Grand Final and was a premiership player again the following season, playing on the half back flank.

References

External links

1931 births
2022 deaths
Australian rules footballers from Victoria (Australia)
Melbourne Football Club players
Melbourne Football Club Premiership players
Two-time VFL/AFL Premiership players